Solnitsata ("The Saltworks") was a prehistoric town located in present-day Bulgaria, near the modern city of Provadia. Believed by archaeologists to be the oldest town in Europe, Solnitsata was a fortified stone settlement - citadelle, inner and outer city with pottery production site and the site of a salt production facility approximately six millennia ago; it flourished ca 4700–4200 BC. The settlement was walled to protect the salt, a crucial commodity in antiquity. Although its population has been estimated at only 350, archaeologist Vassil Nikolov argues that it meets established criteria as a prehistoric city.

Salt production drove Solnitsata's economy, and the town is believed to have supplied salt throughout the Balkans. A large collection of gold objects nearby has led archaeologists to consider that this trade resulted in great wealth for the town's residents — Varna Necropolis. Nearby is the ancient Anhialos, whose livelihood was the extraction of sea salt. The extraction technology can be seen in the Salt Museum, Pomorie.

The town is believed to have been destroyed by an earthquake.

See also
 The Mask from Provadia
 Old Europe (archaeology)
 Durankulak (archaeological site)
 Tell Yunatsite
 Karanovo culture
 List of ancient cities in Thrace and Dacia
 Perperikon
 Seuthopolis

References

Ancient cities of the Balkans
Archaeological sites in Bulgaria
History of Varna Province
Destroyed towns
Geography of Varna Province
Prehistoric sites in Bulgaria
Populated places established in the 5th millennium BC